Hannah Archer Till was an enslaved cook and servant for George Washington. Till was present at Valley Forge encampment where she performed domestic duties and later worked for the Marquis de Lafayette. Till has been honored as a Patriot by the Daughters of the American Revolution.

Early life and family 
Hannah Till was born Hannah Archer in Kent County, Delaware in 1721. She was also called Long Point, a name which was given to her by her father who was an Oneida Indian. Her mother was African American, but more about her identity is unknown.

Marriage and enslavement 
Hannah married Isaac Till before the American Revolutionary War.

Hannah was enslaved by Reverend John Mason of the Associate Reformed Church in New York. Isaac was enslaved by Captain John Johnson of Bergen County, New Jersey.

American Revolution 
Around 1777, Hannah was leased to George Washington to serve as his cook. Isaac was also leased by his enslaver to serve as a military cook and the couple reunited at Valley Forge. By this time, the Tills had three children together.

While at Valley Forge, the couple lived and worked in the Isaac Potts house, known as Washington's headquarters, where Hannah gave birth to their fourth child around January 1778.

Hannah and Isaac purchased their freedom from their enslavers on October 30, 1778. Hannah continued to work for Washington as a paid cook. She also worked for Marquis de Lafayette for six months.

Post-Revolution 
After purchasing their own freedom, the Tills moved to Philadelphia, Pennsylvania where they were members of the First African Presbyterian Church. Hannah continue to work as a cook.

Hannah and Isaac Till had seven children together.

On a return trip to Philadelphia, Lafayette visited Hannah, whom he referred to as 'Aunt Hannah'. He paid her mortgage after learning she was behind on payments.

Death and legacy 
Hannah died in 1826 at the age of 104. She was first interred in the First African Presbyterian Church graveyard at Seventh and Bainbridge Streets in Philadelphia. The graveyard was sold and her remains were moved Lebanon Cemetery in South Philadelphia. After Lebanon Cemetery was also sold, her remains were moved once more to Eden Cemetery in Collingdale, Pennsylvania where she rests today.

October 3, 2015, the Daughters of the American Revolution erected a marker near her gravesite to recognize her contributions. A DAR chapter is also named in her honor.

References 

1721 births
1826 deaths
Patriots in the American Revolution
George Washington
African-American chefs
American women chefs
Burials at Eden Cemetery (Collingdale, Pennsylvania)
18th-century American slaves